Crime in the Czech Republic is combated by the Czech Police and other agencies.

Crime by type

Murder 

In 2012, the Czech Republic had a murder rate of 1.0 per 100,000 population. There were a total of 105 murders in the Czech Republic in 2012.

Corruption 

Political corruption (especially bribery) and theft are one of the most severe issues in the Czech Republic. Group of States Against Corruption mainly criticises the lack of pro-active monitoring of the financing and states that an effective supervisory mechanism is missing.

A survey of Transparency International in 2009 showed that fewer than 1 in 10 respondents find the anti-corruption efforts of their government effective. In 2010, 44% of people answered that the corruption increased.

Terror attacks

In January 2019 a 71-year-old Czech pensioner, Jaromir Balda, was jailed for four years for terrorism after he had felled trees to block railway lines in order to pretend Islamists were responsible. He had  left messages at the scene saying "Allahu Akbar" ("God is great" in Arabic).

See also 
 Law enforcement in the Czech Republic
 Human trafficking in the Czech Republic

References